Indian Key was an unincorporated community in Monroe County and, for a while, Dade County, Florida, United States. It was located in the upper Florida Keys on the island of Indian Key  and is currently a ghost town.

Early history
In 1733, 19 ships of the Spanish treasure fleet were wrecked on the nearby Florida Reef by a hurricane; some of the survivors camped on Indian Key until they were rescued. Beginning in the 18th century, Bahamians and Cubans used Indian Key as a base for fishing, turtling, logging, and wrecking. Crews might stay on the island for months at a time, but there were no permanent settlers.

Settlement and growth
In 1821, Florida was transferred from Spain to the United States, and in 1824, two Key West men, Joshua Appleby and a man named Solomon Snyder, sent an employee, Silas Fletcher, to open a store on Indian Key. The store was to serve wreckers, settlers, and Indians in the upper Keys, and a settlement of primarily Bahamian wreckers and turtlers grew up on the island. By 1829, the settlement was large enough to include a dozen women.

Jacob Housman (or Houseman), a wrecker who had a reputation for operating in a "high-handed and often illegal manner", was at odds with the established wreckers in Key West. He moved to Indian Key in 1830, began buying property on the island, and soon became the leader of the community and its chief landlord. He made numerous improvements to the island, spending close to $40,000 on it in four years. His store, the only one on the island, grossed $30,000 a year. As a result of lobbying by Housman, Indian Key acquired an Inspector of Customs in 1832 and a post office in 1834. In 1836, Houseman persuaded the Territorial Legislative Council to split Dade County off from Monroe County, with the upper and middle Keys in the new county and Indian Key as the temporary county seat. Housman also campaigned to have Indian Key made a port of entry, so that salvage from wrecks could be landed there, rather than in Key West, but without success.

The Second Seminole War began late in 1835. After the New River Massacre in early 1836, most of the Keys were abandoned, except for Key West, Key Vaca, and Indian Key. Despite fears of attack and sightings of Indians in the area, the inhabitants of Indian Key stayed to protect their property and to be close to any wrecks in the upper Keys. The islanders had six cannons and their own small militia company for their defense. (The militia company initially included six slaves; by August 1836 half of the 20-man company were blacks.) The revenue cutter Dexter was based at Indian Key for part of 1838, and after it was withdrawn ships of the Navy Florida Squadron called at Indian Key and established a supply depot there. In 1840, the Navy supply depot was moved to nearby Tea Table Key.

Indian raid
Early in the morning of August 7, 1840, a large party of "Spanish Indians" sneaked onto Indian Key. As one man was up, he could raise the alarm after spotting them. Most of the 50 to 70 people living on the island were able to escape, but 13 were killed. The dead included Dr. Henry Perrine, former United States Consul in Campeche, Mexico, who was waiting at Indian Key until it was safe to take up a  grant on the mainland that Congress had awarded to him.

The naval base on Tea Table Key had been stripped of personnel for an operation on the southwest coast of the mainland, leaving only the doctor, his patients, and five sailors under a midshipman to look after them. This small contingent mounted a couple of cannons on barges and tried to attack the Indians on Indian Key. The Indians fired back at the sailors with musket balls loaded in one of the cannons on shore.  The cannons' recoil on the barges broke them loose, sending them into the water, and the sailors had to retreat. The Indians burned the buildings on Indian Key after thoroughly looting them. Abandoned by almost all of its civilian population, Indian Key was taken over by the Navy for the duration of the Second Seminole War.

Decline
Indian Key continued to be occupied for a while after the Second Seminole War ended in 1842. The county seat for Dade County was moved to Miami in 1844, and the upper Keys, including Indian Key, were returned to Monroe County. The 1850 Census found a few families living there, while only two families were left on the island in 1860. In 1856, during the Third Seminole War, the U.S. Army stationed a few men on the island to protect the two remaining families from possible attack by Seminoles. The Keys lost most of their population again during the Civil War, but William Bethel, a wrecker, continued to live on the island from the 1850s until sometime after 1880.

Notes

References

Bibliography

Further reading

Former populated places in Monroe County, Florida
Populated coastal places in Florida on the Atlantic Ocean
Former county seats in Florida
1824 establishments in Florida Territory
Populated places established in 1824
Ghost towns in Florida